Edgaras Česnauskis (born 5 February 1984) is a Lithuanian former professional footballer who played as a winger.

Club career
Česnauskis was born in Kuršėnai. He started his career in 2000 playing for his hometown team Ekranas.  He played for Dynamo Kyiv from 2003 to 2005, however, he received limited playing time and was often excluded from the matchday squads, appearing in only 9 matches across all competitions for the Ukrainian club. In March 2006, he signed a three-year deal with Russian club Saturn Ramenskoye. He was a regular starter for the club, appearing in 52 league matches and scoring ten goals until May 2008, when he moved to league rival FC Moscow. After the club withdrew from the Russian Premier League in February 2010, Česnauskis signed for Dynamo Moscow prior to the 2010 season.

In March 2011, Česnauskis signed a contract with Rostov until June 2012. In July 2012 he signed a new three-year contract with the club from Rostov-on-Don. After being a regular starter in his first seasons at Rostov, he was relegated to a backup role in the 2013–14 season. After his contract ended in 2015, he retired from professional football.

International career
Česnauskis made five appearances for the Lithuanian under-21 team, scoring three goals. He made his debut for the full national team aged 19, on 3 July 2003 against Estonia.

Until 2013, he earned 43 caps for his country, scoring five goals.

Personal life
His older brother, Deividas, is also a former professional footballer.

Career statistics

Club

International

Scores and results list Lithuania's goal tally first, score column indicates score after each Česnauskis goal.

References

External links
 
 

1984 births
Living people
People from Kuršėnai
Lithuanian footballers
Lithuanian expatriate footballers
Lithuania international footballers
FC Dynamo Kyiv players
FC Saturn Ramenskoye players
FC Moscow players
FC Dynamo Moscow players
Ukrainian Premier League players
Russian Premier League players
Expatriate footballers in Russia
Expatriate footballers in Ukraine
Lithuanian expatriate sportspeople in Ukraine
FC Rostov players
Association football forwards